Aziz Ben Askar (born 30 March 1976) is a football manager and former player.

A defender, Ben Askar played for Stade Lavallois and Stade Malherbe Caen in France, Queens Park Rangers F.C. in England, and for Al-Shamal Sports Club, Umm Salal Sport Club, and Al-Wakrah Sport Club in Qatar. Born in France, at international level he represented the Morocco national football team.

Coaching career
After retiring, Ben Askar started working as a football agent. However, he stopped as an agent because he missed being on the pitch and instead started working toward his coaching license.

Ben Askar started his coaching career with the U17 team of Stade Mayennais. In mid-2015, Ben Askar also began working for UNFP FC (Union Nationale des Footballeurs) as well as being appointed manager of AS Bourny Laval, which also was a part of the process to get his license. In May 2016 he announced that he would not continue at Bourny because he wanted to try something new with more adrenaline. Ben Askar also left UNFP in 2017.

In the summer 2018, Ben Askar had several offers but preferred to stay in France. He was then appointed manager of AC Ajaccio's U19 team. In November 2019, he was appointed manager of his former club, Umm Salal SC, in Qatar.

References

External links
 
 
 

1976 births
Living people
People from Château-Gontier
Sportspeople from Mayenne
French sportspeople of Moroccan descent
Moroccan footballers
French footballers
Footballers from Pays de la Loire
Association football defenders
Morocco international footballers
Ligue 1 players
Ligue 2 players
Stade Lavallois players
Queens Park Rangers F.C. players
Stade Malherbe Caen players
Umm Salal SC players
Al-Shamal SC players
Al-Wakrah SC players
Moroccan football managers
Umm Salal SC managers
Qatar Stars League managers
Moroccan expatriate footballers
French expatriate footballers
Moroccan expatriate football managers
French expatriate football managers
Moroccan expatriate sportspeople in England
French expatriate sportspeople in England
Expatriate footballers in England
Moroccan expatriate sportspeople in Qatar
French expatriate sportspeople in Qatar
Expatriate footballers in Qatar
Expatriate football managers in Qatar